Khan Jahan Ali International Airport is a planned airport in Bagerhat, Bangladesh. As it is very close to Khulna,  it was planned to mainly serve the Khulna city. It is uncertain if the project will be completed as no work has been done since the beginning of the project in 1996, when, following the acquisition of the land and filling of the earth, funds ran out. The as-of-yet incomplete airfield will consist of a small terminal, two connecting taxiways and a north–south oriented runway with turntables at either ends so aircraft can backtrack down it.

Development
The construction deadline has also been extended to June 2020.

References 

Airports in Bangladesh
Buildings and structures in Khulna
Transport in Khulna